Dimovo Municipality is a municipality (obshtina) in Vidin Province, Northwestern Bulgaria, located along the right bank of Danube river in the Danubian Plain. It is named after its administrative centre - the town of Dimovo.

The main road E79 (I-1) crosses the area, connecting the province centre of Vidin with the city of Montana and respectively with the western operating part of Hemus motorway.

Settlements 

Dimovo Municipality includes the following 23 places (towns are shown in bold):

Demography 
The following table shows the change of the population during the last four decades.

Vital statistics

Religion 
According to the latest Bulgarian census of 2011, the religious composition, among those who answered the optional question on religious identification, was the following:

An overwhelming majority of the population of Dimovo Municipality identify themselves as Christians. At the 2011 census, 91.1% of respondents identified as Orthodox Christians belonging to the Bulgarian Orthodox Church.

See also
Provinces of Bulgaria
Municipalities of Bulgaria
List of cities and towns in Bulgaria

References

External links
 Official website 

Municipalities of Vidin Province